The Tongapōrutu River is a river of the Taranaki region of New Zealand's North Island.

One of the largest North Island water falls, Mount Damper Falls, is located on a tributary of the river, Mount Damper Stream near Tahora.

See also
List of rivers of New Zealand

References

Rivers of Taranaki
Rivers of New Zealand